The 1931 Coupe de France Final was a football match held at Stade Olympique Yves-du-Manoir, Colombes on May 3, 1931, that saw Club Français defeat SO Montpellier 3–0 thanks to a goal by Miklos Boros, Arthur Parkes and Robert Furois.

Match details

See also
Coupe de France 1930-1931

External links
Coupe de France results at Rec.Sport.Soccer Statistics Foundation
Report on French federation site

Coupe
1931
Coupe De France Final 1931
Sport in Hauts-de-Seine
Coupe de France Final
Coupe de France Final